Alessio Bolognani (born Cavalese, November 17, 1983) is an Italian ski jumper who has competed since 2002. At the 2006 Winter Olympics in Turin, he finished 11th in the team large hill and 44th in the individual large hill events.

Bolognani's best individual World Cup finish was 42nd in a normal hill event in Germany in 2007. His best individual career finish was 17th in a Continental Cup normal hill event in Slovenia in 2003.

Further notable results
 2003: 1st, Italian championships of ski jumping
 2004: 3rd, Italian championships of ski jumping
 2006:
 3rd, Italian championships of ski jumping
 3rd, Italian championships of ski jumping, large hill
 2007:
 3rd, Italian championships of ski jumping
 3rd, Italian championships of ski jumping, large hill

External links

1983 births
Italian male ski jumpers
Living people
Ski jumpers at the 2006 Winter Olympics
Olympic ski jumpers of Italy
People from Cavalese
Sportspeople from Trentino